Tournaments include international (FIBA), professional (club) and amateur and collegiate levels.

National team tournaments

2012 Olympic Basketball Tournament

Men 
  United States

Women

2012 FIBA Under-17 World Championships

Men 
2012 FIBA Under-17 World Championship in Lithuania:

Women 
2012 FIBA Women's Under-17 World Championships in Netherlands:

Other FIBA-sanctioned tournaments 
Men:
2012 William Jones Cup in Taipei:
 
  Mahram Tehran BC

Professional club seasons

Continental championships
Men:
Euroleague:
  Olympiacos   CSKA Moscow   FC Barcelona Regal
Euroleague MVP:  Andrei Kirilenko, CSKA Moscow
Euroleague Final Four MVP:  Vassilis Spanoulis, Olympiacos
Alphonso Ford Trophy (season's leading scorer):  Bo McCalebb,  Montepaschi Siena
Eurocup:
  Khimki   Valencia Basket   Lietuvos rytas
EuroChallenge:
  Beşiktaş Milangaz   Élan Chalon   Triumph Lyubertsy

Women:
EuroLeague Women:
  Ros Casares Valencia   Rivas Ecópolis   UMMC Ekaterinburg

Transnational seasons

Men

Domestic league seasons for Men

*Includes one team from New Zealand.

**Includes one team each from Belarus, Kazakhstan, and Latvia. The highest ranking team is also named as the Russian champions.

***Includes one team from Canada.

Domestic league seasons for Women

 WNBA
Season:
 Eastern Conference: Indiana Fever
 Western Conference: Minnesota Lynx
 Finals: The Fever defeat the Lynx 3–1 in the best-of-5 series.

College seasons for Men

 NJCAA
Division I:
Division II:
Division III:

College seasons for Women
 NCAA
Division I: Baylor 80, Notre Dame 61
 Baylor becomes the first team in NCAA basketball history to win 40 games in a season.
 Most Outstanding Player: Brittney Griner, Baylor
WNIT: Oklahoma State 75, James Madison 68
Women's Basketball Invitational:
Division II: Shaw 88, Ashland 82 (OT)
Division III: Illinois Wesleyan 57, George Fox 43
 NAIA
NAIA Division I:
NAIA Division II:
  NJCAA
 Division I:Trinity Valley Community College 69, Hutchinson Community College 55
 Division II:Monroe College 78, Lake Michigan College 73
 Division III:Rock Valley College 82, Roxbury Community College 64
 UAAP Women's: FEU defeated La Salle in two games to win their second consecutive champion and finish an undefeated season.

Prep
 USA Today Boys Basketball Ranking #1:
 USA Today Girls Basketball Ranking #1:
 NCAA (Philippines) Juniors:   defeated  2+1–1 in the best-of-5 finals. Because San Beda were unbeaten in the elimination round, they were given a 1–0 series lead before finals play started.
 UAAP Juniors:  defeated  2–1 in the best-of-3 finals.

Awards and honors

Naismith Memorial Basketball Hall of Fame
Class of 2012:
Players: Mel Daniels, Katrina McClain, Reggie Miller, Ralph Sampson, Chet Walker, Jamaal Wilkes
Coaches: Lidia Alexeyeva, Don Nelson
Contributors: Don Barksdale, Phil Knight
Referees: Hank Nichols
Teams: All American Red Heads

Women's Basketball Hall of Fame
Class of 2012
 Nancy Fahey
 Nikki McCray
 Pamela McGee
 Inge Nissen
 Robin Roberts
 Dawn Staley

Professional
Men
NBA Most Valuable Player Award: LeBron James, Miami Heat
NBA Rookie of the Year Award: Kyrie Irving, Cleveland Cavaliers
NBA Defensive Player of the Year Award: Tyson Chandler, New York Knicks
NBA Sixth Man of the Year Award: James Harden, Oklahoma City Thunder
NBA Most Improved Player Award: Ryan Anderson, Orlando Magic
NBA Sportsmanship Award: Jason Kidd, Dallas Mavericks
NBA Coach of the Year Award: Gregg Popovich, San Antonio Spurs
J. Walter Kennedy Citizenship Award: Pau Gasol, Los Angeles Lakers
NBA Executive of the Year Award: Larry Bird, Indiana Pacers
FIBA Europe Player of the Year Award: Andrei Kirilenko, 2011–12 Minnesota Timberwolves
Euroscar Award:Andrei Kirilenko, 2011–12 Minnesota Timberwolves
NBA All-Star Game MVP:Kevin Durant, Oklahoma City Thunder
Chuck Daly Lifetime Achievement Award: Pat Riley, Miami Heat
Women
WNBA Most Valuable Player Award: Tina Charles, Connecticut Sun
WNBA Defensive Player of the Year Award: Tamika Catchings, Indiana Fever
WNBA Rookie of the Year Award: Nneka Ogwumike, Los Angeles Sparks
WNBA Sixth Woman of the Year Award: Renee Montgomery, Connecticut Sun
WNBA Most Improved Player Award: Kristi Toliver, Los Angeles Sparks
Kim Perrot Sportsmanship Award: Kara Lawson, Connecticut Sun
WNBA Coach of the Year Award: Carol Ross, Los Angeles Sparks
FIBA Europe Player of the Year Award: Expected to be announced in February 2013.
WNBA Finals Most Valuable Player Award: Tamika Catchings, Indiana Fever

Collegiate 
 Combined
Legends of Coaching Award: Geno Auriemma, Connecticut
 Men
John R. Wooden Award: Anthony Davis, Kentucky
Naismith College Coach of the Year: Bill Self, Kansas
Frances Pomeroy Naismith Award: Reggie Hamilton, Oakland
Associated Press College Basketball Player of the Year: Anthony Davis, Kentucky
NCAA basketball tournament Most Outstanding Player: Luke Hancock, Louisville
USBWA National Freshman of the Year: Anthony Davis, Kentucky
Associated Press College Basketball Coach of the Year: Frank Haith, Missouri
Naismith Outstanding Contribution to Basketball: Don Meyer
 Women
John R. Wooden Award: Brittney Griner, Baylor
Naismith College Player of the Year: Brittney Griner, Baylor
Naismith College Coach of the Year: Kim Mulkey, Baylor
Wade Trophy: Brittney Griner, Baylor
Frances Pomeroy Naismith Award: Tavelyn James, Eastern Michigan
Associated Press Women's College Basketball Player of the Year: Brittney Griner, Baylor
NCAA basketball tournament Most Outstanding Player: Brittney Griner, Baylor
Basketball Academic All-America Team: Elena Delle Donne, Delaware
Kay Yow Award: Karl Smesko, Florida Gulf Coast
Carol Eckman Award: Sue Ramsey, Ashland University
Maggie Dixon Award: Jennifer Hoover, High Point
USBWA National Freshman of the Year: Elizabeth Williams, Duke
Associated Press College Basketball Coach of the Year: Kim Mulkey, Baylor
List of Senior CLASS Award women's basketball winners: Nneka Ogwumike, Stanford
Nancy Lieberman Award: Skylar Diggins, Notre Dame
Naismith Outstanding Contribution to Basketball: Teresa Edwards

Events
 April 18 – Tennessee Lady Volunteers coach Pat Summitt stepped down after 38 years and 8 NCAA championships.  She was succeeded by assistant Holly Warlick.
 December 17 – Syracuse coach Jim Boeheim became the third NCAA Division I men's coach with 900 career wins following the Orange's 72–68 win over Detroit. He had been preceded to 900 wins by Bob Knight and current leader Mike Krzyzewski.

Movies
Benji – A documentary about the life and 1984 murder of Chicago high school superstar Ben Wilson.
The Other Dream Team – A documentary about the 1992 Lithuanian Olympic basketball team.
Thunderstruck

Deaths
 January 3 — Gene Bartow, American college coach (Memphis State, UCLA, UAB), and member of the National Collegiate Basketball Hall of Fame (born 1930)
 January 5 — Alexander Sizonenko, Russian basketball player (born 1959)
 January 10 — Jack Heron, American college coach (Sacramento State) (born 1926)
 January 11 — Wally Osterkorn, NBA player (Syracuse Nationals) (born 1928)
 January 23 — Larry Striplin, American college coach (Belmont) (born 1929)
 January 28 — Joseph Curran, American college coach (Canisius) (born 1922)
 February 1 — Charlie Spoonhour, American college coach (Saint Louis and others) (born 1939)
 February 1 — Jerry Steiner, American National Basketball League player (Indianapolis Kautskys, Fort Wayne Zollner Pistons) (born 1918)
 February 8 — Lew Hitch, NBA player (Minneapolis Lakers, Milwaukee Hawks) (born 1929)
 February 16 — Gene Vance, BAA/NBA player (Chicago Stags, Milwaukee Hawks) (born 1923)
 February 25 — Dick Davies, gold medal-winning player for Team USA at the 1964 Summer Olympics (born 1936)
 February 26 — Zollie Volchok, NBA Executive (Seattle SuperSonics) (born 1916)
 March 8 — Charlie Hoag, 1952 Olympic Gold Medal winner and National Champion at Kansas (born 1931)
 March 12 — Dick Harter, American coach (Charlotte Hornets, University of Oregon) (born 1930)
 March 16 — Ed Dahler, NBA player (Philadelphia Warriors) (born 1926)
 March 24 — Pete McCaffrey, gold medal-winning player for Team USA at the 1964 Summer Olympics (born 1938)
 April 11 — Tippy Dye, American college coach (Brown, Ohio State, Washington) (born 1915)
 April 11 — Bob Lewis, National champion at Utah (born 1925)
 April 15 — Dwayne Schintzius, NBA player (San Antonio Spurs, New Jersey Nets, among others) (born 1968)
 April 15 — Bob Wright, high school and college coach (Morehead State) (born 1926)
 April 30 — Andrew Levane, NBA player and coach (New York Knicks) (born 1920)
 April 30 — Frank Zummach, NBL coach (Sheboygan Red Skins) (born 1911)
 May 1 — Greg Jackson, NBA player (New York Knicks, Phoenix Suns) (born 1952)
 May 6 — Pat Frink, NBA player (Cincinnati Royals) (born 1945)
 May 13 — Nolan Richardson III, American college coach (Tennessee State) (born 1964)
 May 26 — Lou Watson, American college coach (Indiana) (born c. 1924)
 May 28 — Ed Burton, NBA player (New York Knicks, St. Louis Hawks) (born 1939)
 May 30 — Jack Twyman, Naismith Hall of Fame NBA player (Cincinnati Royals) (born 1934)
 May 31 — Orlando Woolridge, NBA player (Los Angeles Lakers, among others) (born 1959)
 June 2 — LeRoy Ellis, NBA player (Los Angeles Lakers, among others) (born 1940)
 June 4 — Jim Fitzgerald, NBA owner (Milwaukee Bucks, Golden State Warriors) (born 1926)
 June 7 — Chuck Share, NBA player (St. Louis Hawks, among others) (born 1927)
 June 7 — Mervin Jackson, ABA player (Utah Stars) (born 1946)
 June 8 — Pete Brennan, NBA player (New York Knicks) (born 1936)
 June 14 — Dick Acres, 78, American college coach (Oral Roberts).
 June 18 — Dennis Hamilton, NBA/ABA player (Los Angeles Lakers, among others) (born 1944)
 June 24 — Heino Kruus, Olympic Silver medalist for the Soviet Union in 1952. (born 1926)
 June 24 — Ted Luckenbill, NBA player (San Francisco Warriors). (born 1939)
 June 26 — Pat Cummings, NBA player (New York Knicks, Miami Heat). (born 1956)
 June 26 — Jack Hewson, BAA player (Boston Celtics). (born 1924)
 June 28 — Herb Scherer, NBA player (Tri-Cities Blackhawks, New York Knicks). (born 1929)
 July 9 — Kenny Heitz, three-time NCAA champion at UCLA. (born 1947)
 July 13 — Warren Jabali, ABA player (Oakland Oaks, among others). (born 1946)
 July 26 — Neil Reed, College player (Indiana, Southern Miss) (born 1975)
 August 2 — Ruy de Freitas, Olympic Bronze medalist for Brazil in 1948. (born 1916)
 August 3 — John Pritchard, NBA player (Waterloo Hawks) and Washington Generals player (born 1927)
 August 4 — Arnie Risen, Naismith Hall of Fame NBA player (Rochester Royals, Boston Celtics) (born 1924)
 August 6 — Dan Roundfield, ABA and NBA player (Atlanta Hawks, among others) (born 1953)
 August 17 — Pál Bogár, Hungarian Olympic player (born 1927)
 August 27 — Art Heyman, NBA and ABA player (New York Knicks, among others) (born 1941)
 September 21 — Ed Conlin, NBA player (Syracuse Nationals, Philadelphia Warriors, Detroit Pistons) (born 1933)
 September 29 — Bob Stevens, college coach (Oklahoma, South Carolina) (born 1924)
 October 8 — Donnie Butcher, NBA player (New York Knicks, Detroit Pistons) and coach (Detroit Pistons) (born 1936)
 October 9 — Kenny Rollins, NBA player, college national champion at Kentucky, Olympic gold medalist in 1948 (born 1923)
 October 12 — Ervin Kassai, Hungarian referee, FIBA Hall of Fame member (born 1925)
 October 18 — Slater Martin, Naismith Hall of Fame player, five-time NBA champion (Minneapolis Lakers, St. Louis Hawks) (born 1925)
 October 30 — Dan Tieman, NBA player (Cincinnati Royals) (born 1940)
 November 13 — Murray Arnold, college and professional coach (Chattanooga, Perth Wildcats) (born 1938)
 November 25 — Carlisle Towery, American National Basketball League player (Fort Wayne Pistons) (born 1920)
 December 1 — John Crigler, national championship college player at Kentucky (1958) (born 1936)
 December 1 — Rick Majerus, college coach (Saint Louis, Utah, Ball State, Marquette) (born 1948)
 December 4 — Ken Trickey, college coach (Middle Tennessee, Oral Roberts, Oklahoma City, Iowa State) (born 1933)
 December 7 — Nikola Ilić, Serbian player (born 1985)
 December 12 — Walt Kirk, American NBA player (Tri-Cities Blackhawks, among others) (born 1924)
 December 20 — Jerome Whitehead, American NBA player (San Diego Clippers, Golden State Warriors, among others) (born 1956)
 December 22 — Charles Cleveland, American college player (Alabama Crimson Tide) (born 1951)
 December 28 — Dan Kraus, American BAA player (Baltimore Bullets) (born 1923)
 December 28 — Fred Rehm, American NBL player (Oshkosh All-Stars), NCAA champion at Wisconsin (1941) (born 1921)
 December 29 — Erv Staggs, American ABA player (Miami Floridians) (born 1948)

See also
 Timeline of women's basketball

References

External links